The Parti Kuasa Rakyat is a political party that is based on Marhaenism. It is in favour of abolishing the Perbadanan Tabung Pendidikan Tinggi Nasional (PTPTN) and replacing it with scholarships involving the B40 and M40 groups, as well as free healthcare, environmental sustainability and "freeing people from the grip of middlemen and racial capital".

History
It was founded by Ismail Sabri Yaakob's brother Kamarazaman Yaakob on 10 October 2021.

Leadership structure 

President

Kamaruzaman Yaakob

Sponsor committee

Nik Abdul Aziz Nik Hassan
Gabriel Walter
Gobalakrishnan Nagapan
Mohamad Nasir Saludin
Hamzah Jaaffar
Anas Yusof Sulaiman
Sahandri Gani Hamzah
Helmi Ibrahim
Razali Abd Razak
Suharmili Rosle
Ching I Boon

== List of PPP presidents ==

== state chairman ==

PBM leadership structure

Elected representatives

General election results

State election results

See also

References

Notes

External links

References 

Political parties in Malaysia
2021 establishments in Malaysia
Political parties established in 2021